Baidoo is a surname. Notable people with the surname include:

Charlotte Lily Baidoo, Ghanaian banker
Ishmael Baidoo (born 1998), Ghanaian footballer
Michael Baidoo (born 1999), Ghanaian footballer
Shabazz Baidoo (born 1988), English footballer
Stephen Baidoo (born 1976), Ghanaian footballer